Than Myint Aung (born ) is a Burmese philanthropist and writer, known for her novels and short stories on societal issues.

In 2001, she co-founded the Free Funeral Service Society, a nonprofit that offers free funeral services for poor families. In 2005, she established the Thuka Yeikmyon orphanage for children with HIV in Yangon. In 2010, she established Twilight Villa, a retirement home for impoverished elderly in Yangon's East Dagon Township. In 2013, she opened a second orphanage for children with HIV in Mandalay. In June 2014, she was awarded the Citizen of Burma award for her philanthropic work.

In June 2016, she was appointed to the Yangon City Development Committee.

In the aftermath of the 2021 Myanmar coup d'état, she was arrested by the military regime. On the 4th of January 2023, which happened to be the Independence Day of Myanmar, she was granted her release.

References 

Burmese philanthropists
Burmese novelists
Women novelists
20th-century Burmese writers
20th-century Burmese women writers
20th-century philanthropists
21st-century Burmese writers
21st-century Burmese women writers
21st-century philanthropists
1950s births
Living people
20th-century novelists
21st-century novelists